The MF 19 (Métro Fer appel d'offre 2019; 2019 procurement rail metro) is a class of rolling stock being built for the Paris Métro. It was ordered to replace existing trains on lines 3, 3bis, 7, 7bis, 8, 10, 12 and 13, starting in 2025. It is being built by a consortium of Alstom and Bombardier. Lines 3bis and 7bis are planned to use 4-car trains, an upgrade from the current 3-car sets. Lines 3, 10, and 12 will use 5-car sets totaling .

References 

Paris Métro rolling stock

750 V DC multiple units
Alstom multiple units
Electric multiple units of France
Bombardier Transportation multiple units